The Three Piano Sonatas, WoO 47 were probably composed by Ludwig van Beethoven in 1783, when he was twelve years old. The sonatas show a certain level of precocity and serve as a precursor to the masterworks he later produced.

Overview 
Like Mozart's, Beethoven's musical talent was recognized at a young age, and these three piano sonatas give an early glimpse of the composer's abilities, as well as his boldness. Beethoven was writing in a form usually attempted by older, more mature composers, as the sonata was a cornerstone of Classical piano literature. Since they were written at such an early age (and Beethoven himself did not assign them opus numbers), the works have historically been omitted from the canon of Beethoven's piano sonatas. However, Barry Cooper included the trio in his critical edition of the sonatas created for ABRSM, arguing that "A complete edition has to be complete, and if you ignore early works, you don't show the longer trajectory of the composer's development." The inclusion of these three works raises Beethoven's total number of piano sonatas from 32 to 35.

The sonatas

No. 1 in E major 

Beginning of No. 1 in E major

No. 2 in F minor 

Beginning of No. 2 in F minor

No. 3 in D major 

Beginning of No. 3 in D major

See also 
List of compositions by Ludwig van Beethoven

References 
Notes

Citations

Sources

Further reading

External links 
 

Piano sonatas by Ludwig van Beethoven
1783 compositions
Music dedicated to nobility or royalty
Compositions in E-flat major
Compositions in F minor
Compositions in D major